Beaver Island is an island in Lake Michigan in the U.S. state of Michigan. At , it is the largest island in Lake Michigan and the third largest island in Michigan after Isle Royale and Drummond Island. Beaver Island had a total population of 657 at the 2010 census. Beaver Island is part of Charlevoix County.

In 1856, it was home to a unique American religious colony, a theocratic monarchy ruled by the self-appointed "King Strang", who was the leader of the Church of Jesus Christ of Latter Day Saints, colloquially known as Strangites to distinguish them from the much larger the Church of Jesus Christ of Latter-day Saints. Irish American immigrants later settled in the island, and it has remained a popular vacation and tourist destination.  Portions of the island and surrounding archipelago are protected as part of the Beaver Islands State Wildlife Research Area.

History

The Mormon Kingdom 

Although Beaver Island is known today mostly for its beaches, forests, recreational harbor and seclusion, previously it was the site of a unique Latter Day Saint kingdom.

The island's association with Mormonism began with the death of Joseph Smith, the founder of the Latter Day Saint movement. Most Latter Day Saints considered Brigham Young to be his successor, but many others followed James J. Strang. Strang founded the Church of Jesus Christ of Latter Day Saints (Strangite), claiming it was the sole legitimate continuation of the church that Joseph Smith founded. His church continues to exist, though not on Beaver Island, and numbers a maximum of 300 adherents. His group initially settled in Voree, Wisconsin Territory, in 1844, and established a community there that persists today as an unincorporated community within the Town of Burlington, Wisconsin.

Seeking refuge from persecution, Strang moved his followers from Voree to Beaver Island in 1848. At the time, the island was inhabited by mostly Irish Catholic immigrants. In particular they came from an Irish-speaking island (off the coast of County Donegal) called Arranmore. The Strangites flourished under his rule and became a political power in the region. They founded the town of St. James, which was named in honor of Strang. They constructed a road denominated "King's Highway" into the interior of the island that remains one of its primary thoroughfares. The Strangites cleared land; constructed cabins, farms and other improvements; and attempted to establish themselves permanently on the island.

Strang was elected to the Michigan House of Representatives in 1853 and again in 1855. He founded the first newspaper in Northern Michigan, the Northern Islander. During his tenure in the Legislature, he made the island the center of the new County of Manitou, which included the Beaver Islands, Fox Islands and North Manitou and South Manitou Islands, and had its seat at St. James in Beaver Island. The state of Michigan abolished Manitou County in 1895 (see below).

Once established on Beaver Island, Strang declared himself a polygamist, contrary to his previous opposition of it. He had five wives, one male lover and fathered a total of fourteen children.

In 1850, Strang proclaimed himself king, not of the island, but of his church, which then included most of the inhabitants of the island. He was crowned on July 8 of that year inside a large log "tabernacle" that his adherents erected, in an elaborate coronation ceremony. On him was bestowed a crown that a witness described as "a shiny metal ring with a cluster of glass stars in the front", a royal red robe, shield, breastplate, and wooden scepter. The Strangite tabernacle and Strang's house are no longer extant, and also the Strangite regalia, yet a printing shop that his disciples erected persists as the only Strangite construction remaining in the island. Presently the printing shop houses a museum of insular history.

Strang and his adherents often conflicted with their neighbors on the island and adjacent locales. While claiming dominion of only his church, Strang tended to exert authority over non-Strangites on the island also, and was regularly accused of forcibly seizing their property and physically assaulting them. Open hostility between the two groups was frequently violent, and the majority of the Irish immigrants fled to the neighboring island of Mackinac. Ruffians beat Strangites at the post office, and Strang once fired a cannon at some unruly drunken fishermen who had threatened to expel his church from the island. Strangites held an increasing monopoly of local government that blurred the distinction between church and state.

While Strang held many progressive ideas such as the conservation of woodlands, many judged his autocratic rule intolerable. One edict, for example, prescribed the clothing of Strangite women (see bloomers). Two women refused obedience and Strang had their husbands flogged, an act that was rendered more tolerable after one of them was discovered in the act of adultery. While recovering from their floggings, the husbands conspired against Strang. On June 16, 1856, the US naval gunboat  entered the harbor of St. James and Strang was invited aboard. As Strang walked along the dock the two conspirators shot him from behind and then ran in the gunboat, which departed and disembarked the men in Mackinac Island. Neither man was arrested or convicted of the murder.

After Strang died of his wounds on July 9, 1856, mobs from Mackinac Island and St. Helena Island arrived and expelled the Strangites, who then numbered approximately 2,600, from Beaver Island and reclaimed the island. Upon expulsion of the Strangites, local government in Manitou County, which included Beaver Island, almost ceased. Court sessions and elections were rarely held, county offices were often vacant, and the region acquired a lawless reputation. Michiganian Governor John J. Bagley affirmed this reputation in 1877 when he advocated for abolition of the county. A bill was introduced to this effect yet failed to be enacted. A second attempt in 1895 was successful, and the Beaver Islands were incorporated into Charlevoix County while Fox and Manitou Islands were incorporated into Leelanau County.

"America's Emerald Isle"
Irish Catholic fishermen from Gull Island, Mackinac Island and various port cities of mainland Michigan, and also emigrants from County Donegal, Ireland, rapidly replaced the Strangites in Beaver Island. Their community, which more Irish immigration increased, developed a unique identity that the isolation of the Island from the mainland fostered. Catholic sermons and even quotidian conversations were in Ulster Irish for many years. By the middle of the 1880s the Island became the largest supplier of freshwater fish consumed in the US, yet overfishing and technological change ended this dominance by 1900.

In addition to King Strang, the Island became the residence of two other locally famous persons. Father Peter Gallagher, a priest from 1865 to 1898, was a colorful and charismatic leader who dominated insular society. He once engaged one of his parishioners in a fistfight in the insular chapel. Feodor Protar, who arrived in 1893, was a member of the religious movement founded by Leo Tolstoy. He served as a local doctor and friend-to-all while living as a recluse in a cabin in the interior of the Island. Protar died in 1925 and left many admirers.

Logging, which was always an important part of the insular economy, greatly increased with the formation of the Beaver Island Logging Company in 1901. Docks, housing, railroads and a mill impacted the local scenery, while fishing continued as the primary economic activity. A great decrease of the fish population in the 1940s caused the exodus of most of the residents, until tourism in the 1970s renewed interest in the Island. Presently the Island is a popular recreational destination for residents throughout the Great Lakes Basin.

In 1938, John W. Green (1871–1963), a resident of Beaver Island, was recorded by the young folklorist Alan Lomax singing traditional songs, which can be heard on the Library of Congress website.

Geography 
It is mostly flat and sandy, with large forested tracts. According to data of the US census, it has  of land, and a permanent population of 657 as of 2010. The more densely populated part, which comprises a mere 6% of total insular land, is within Saint James Township on the northern part of the island. The census of 2010 reported its population as 365. St. James Township also includes Garden Island, High Island, Hog Island and several minor islands in Lake Michigan, which are all permanently uninhabited Peaine Township, which comprises the remaining 94% of insular land, contains large parcels of state land which are managed as part of the Beaver Islands State Wildlife Research Area. The research area is mostly undeveloped, with some relictual homesteads within the township that were constructed in the clearings of successful farms of the nineteenth century. In 2010 the township had a population of 292.

The island has several small to moderately sized lakes, including Lake Geneserath in the southeast, Greenes Lake and Fox Lake in the central part, and Font Lake, Egg Lake, Round Lake and Barneys Lake in the northern part. There are only two named streams: Jordan River that flows into Sand Bay on the eastern part of the island and Iron Ore Creek that flows into Iron Ore Bay on the southern part.

Climate
The island is within a climatic region that has great seasonal differences in temperature, with warm to hot, and often humid, summers and cold, even severely cold, winters. According to the Köppen Climate Classification system, it has a humid continental climate, which is abbreviated "Dfb" on climatic maps.

Economy 

Historically, the primary industries in the island are fishing, logging and farming. Presently the economy centers in governmental services, tourism and residential and cottage construction. Recreational opportunities abound in the insular harbor, beaches, inland lakes and the state forest that includes much of the island. A golf course, nature trails, restaurants, hotels, a marina and other amenities are available.

The island describes itself as "America's Emerald Isle" in allusion to the Irish ancestry of many of its residents.

Central Michigan University owns and operates a research facility in the island, denominated the "CMU Biological Station". The station hosts classes and workshops for students and researchers. CMU also owns a former Coast Guard Boathouse on Whiskey Point in the northern part of the island and part of Miller's Marsh.

Transportation
Two small airlines serve the island: Island Airways and Fresh Air Aviation. Airplanes are twin engine propeller airplanes for 6–10 passengers. The flight to the island takes approximately 20 minutes, are available multiple times a day throughout the year and reservations often are accepted with only brief notice. Luggage generally is included in the cost of a ticket, with a "pounds per person" limit, and additional luggage is charged according to its weight in pounds. Pets may be transported also, with prices of such tickets premised on the size of pets. Island Airways' airplanes depart from Charlevoix to Welke Airport (6Y8), a privately owned yet publicly accessible airport in Peaine Township that is approximately one mile (1,600 meters) south of St. James. Fresh Air Aviation's airplanes depart from Charlevoix to the public airport of Peaine Township (KSJX), which is on the Western side, a little over 4 miles from St. James.

Beaver Island Boat Company operates a scheduled automobile ferry service from Charlevoix during most of the year. Daily service is available from May through September, and a more limited service is available October through mid-December. The ferry runs on a seasonal schedule where the amount of daily trips ranges from one to four trips departing from Charlevoix to the island. The ferry is closed from January through March. Travelers are advised to verify the weather before boarding because rough waves can cause sea sickness. Visitors wishing to transport their own vehicles must make reservations in advance as ferry space is limited. Two ferry boats are in service, The Emerald Isle and the Beaver Islander, the latter of which is smaller. The journey is slightly more than two hours to two and one half hours, contingent on weather and which ferry is ridden. Dogs, bikes, canoes, kayaks, boats, and motorcycles can be transported aboard the ferry for a fee.

Two lighthouses are on the island:
Beaver Island Harbor Light (St. James Light), erected in 1870, on the northern part of the Island, which continues to aid navigation.
Beaver Island Head Lighthouse on the southern part of the Island, erected in 1858, was deactivated in 1961.

Archipelago

The islands of the Beaver Islands archipelago include, in approximate order of size from largest to smallest:

Beaver Island
 Garden Island
 High Island
 South Fox Island
 Hog Island
 North Fox Island
 Gull Island
 Whiskey Island
 Ojibwa Island
 Trout Island
 Grape Island
 Hat Island
 Shoe Island
 Pismire Island

Gull, Hat, Pismire, and Shoe Islands comprise the Lake Michigan division of the Michigan Islands National Wildlife Refuge and are administered as a satellite of the Seney National Wildlife Refuge. Pismire and Shoe Islands are also part of the Michigan Islands Wilderness Area.

Restaurants and Bars 
The island currently has eight restaurants and two bars. These establishments include:

 Beachcomber
 Circle M
 Daddy Franks
 Dalwhinnie
 Harbour Bodega 
 Paradise Bay Coffee Shop, Inc.
 Shamrock Bar and Restaurant 
 Stoney Acre Grill and Pub
 Sunset Restaurant at Beaver Island Lodge 
 Whiskey Point Brewing Company LLC

Events

Dark Sky Island 
Beaver Island is a part of the Dark Sky Sanctuary which is designated to only 14 locations in the whole world. The Dark Sky Sanctuary is used as a way to raise awareness for the benefits of reducing light pollution. The Dark Sky Sanctuary is not only a way to promote appreciation for the environment, but it also allows for the exploration of the night sky. In honor of Beaver Island being involved in the Dark SKy Sanctuary, Beaver Island Community Center creates events to bring the community together to view constellations, meteor showers, the Northern Lights, etc.

Beaver Island Music Festival 
The Beaver Island Music Festival brings music artists from around the world to perform in the wilderness of Beaver Island. Founded in 2003, the festival is centered around combining music and wilderness together. The Festival is catered to all ages, but is centered around nature at the core. The festival is typically during the third week of July, and it lasts three days. Some of the well known performers of the festival include Sponge, an American rock band founded in Detroit; Lipstick Jodi; The Burney Sisters; etc. The Beaver Island Music Festival involves local businesses and community members to establish itself as a community-wide organization.

Beaver Island Bike Festival 
The Beaver Island Bike Festival allows bikers to enjoy the scenery of Beaver Island at their own leisure. The festival occurs during the third week of June. Biker can bike 20 to 42 miles of self-paced biking. Campgrounds, rest stops, food, drinks, and restrooms are provided for those attending. Bikers can also visit the scattered historical sights and monuments throughout the island. There is also a downtown party to conclude the festival where music and entertainment is provided.

Baroque on Beaver 
Founded in 2001, Baroque on Beaver is an event where orchestral and vocal performers come to Beaver island during the end of July and beginning weeks of August. This event is presented by the Beaver Island Performing Arts Alliance (BIPAA), where they strive to bring traditional classical music to this remote Great Lakes island.

Beaver Island Irish Féile 
Beginning in 2019, the Beaver Island Irish Féile showcases the Irish heritage of Beaver Island. The event takes place during the second week of September. The event includes music and activities that center around the unique history of the Island.

See also
Populated islands of the Great Lakes
List of islands of Michigan
List of islands of the United States

References

External links

BeaverIsland.net
Beaver Island Virtual Tour
Beaver Island Chamber of Commerce
Satellite map of Beaver Island from Google Maps
Beaver Island Boat Company
Island Airways
Fresh Air Aviation
Central Michigan University Biological Station on Beaver Island
Technology a blessing, a curse for remote island, By Martha Irvine, Associated Press, November 8, 2010.
WVBI, the island's FM radio station. 
WVBI BIC Center Community Calendar, an on-line calendar of events on Beaver Island.
Beaver Island Ferry Schedule

Islands of Charlevoix County, Michigan
History of Michigan
Irish-American culture in Michigan
Irish language outside Ireland
Significant places in Mormonism
Church of Jesus Christ of Latter Day Saints (Strangite)
Islands of Lake Michigan in Michigan
Riots and civil disorder in Michigan